Estádio Augusto Bauer is a football stadium located in Brusque city, Santa Catarina state, Brazil. It hosted the home games of Clube Atlético Carlos Renaux from 1931 to 1987 and currently hosts the games of Brusque Futebol Clube. The stadium has a maximum capacity of 5,000 people and was built in 1931.

History
The stadium was inaugurated on June 7, 1931 when Marcílio Dias beat Carlos Renaux 1–0. The stadium was expanded between the 1950s and 1960, with the inclusion of new bleachers, a bigger football field, an embankment and floodlights.

References

Augusto
Brusque Futebol Clube
Estadio Augusto Bauer